Club Fé were a Cuban baseball team in the Cuban League based in Havana. They played in 1882, 1885, from 1887-1890, and again from 1901 to 1914.

Fé first played during the 1882 season, which was canceled after four games and all game results where voided, though Fé had had a 1-4 record.

The club finished in second place in the spring of 1885 behind Habana with a 3-3 record, and ended the winter of 1885 in third place behind Habana and Almendares.

Fé won the 1888 championship with a 12-3 record. Managed by Antonio Utera, Francisco Hernandez won 10 games and José María Teuma batted .350 and won two games.

Alberto Azoy managed the team from 1905 to 1910, during which the won the league championship in 1905. They would win again in 1912 under manager Tinti Molina.

Notable players
Rube Foster
Pete Hill
Antonio María García
Eusebio González
Mike González
Charlie Grant
Louis Santop
Dolf Luque
Juan Manuel Pastoriza
John Henry Lloyd
Smokey Joe Williams

Notes

References

Defunct baseball teams in Cuba
Cuban League teams